Mariusz Magiera (born August 25, 1984 in Andrychów) is a Polish professional footballer who plays for defender who plays for III liga club LKS Goczałkowice-Zdrój.

References

External links 
 

1984 births
People from Andrychów
Sportspeople from Lesser Poland Voivodeship
Living people
Polish footballers
Association football defenders
Górnik Zabrze players
ŁKS Łódź players
Wisła Kraków players
GKS Bełchatów players
LKS Goczałkowice-Zdrój players
Ekstraklasa players
I liga players
III liga players